The 2018 Asian Trampoline Gymnastics Championships was held at the University of Makati in Makati, Metro Manila, Philippines, May 19–20, 2018. It was the fourth edition of the competition overall and the second edition to feature senior level events.

The tournament was contested by about 100 athletes from 10 nations. The competition was organized by the Gymnastics Association of the Philippines and was approved by the International Gymnastics Federation. Nations with medalists in the junior level events qualifies at least a berth for the 2018 Summer Youth Olympics in Buenos Aires, Argentina.

Participating nations

Medal winners

Results

Senior
Final - Men

Final - Women

References 

Asian Gymnastics Championships
2018 in gymnastics
Sport in Makati
International gymnastics competitions hosted by the Philippines